The Cambridge University Caving Club was founded in 1949. The club organizes single rope technique (SRT) training, social events, and weekend caving trips as well as longer expeditions.

Currently, annual expeditions are carried out to the Ardèche region of France for sport.  Between 1988 and 1997 there were annual Christmas expeditions to Majorca, Spain.

The main summer expedition, which has been going on nearly every year since 1976, has been to the Loser Plateau, in the Totes Gebirge Mountains, Austria.  Since around 1980 the base camp has been in Bad Aussee.

Notable caves that have been discovered and explored include Steinbrückenhöhle (1999–present), Kaninchenhöhle (1988–1998), Stellerweghöhle (1972–1982).

Former members of the club have founded Hong Meigui cave exploration society of China.

See also 

 University of Bristol Spelæological Society
 Caving in the United Kingdom

References

External links
Club Website

Caving
Caving organisations in the United Kingdom